Nature reserves in Northern Ireland, are designated and maintained by the Northern Ireland Environment Agency.

There are 47 national nature reserves in Northern Ireland.

County Antrim
Belshaw's Quarry Nature Reserve, grid ref: J229 671
Breen Oakwood Nature Reserve, grid ref: D125 338
Giant's Causeway National Nature Reserve, grid ref: C954 453
Glenariff Nature Reserve, grid ref: D210 205
Kebble Nature Reserve, grid ref: D095 515
Portrush Nature Reserve, grid ref: C856 412
Randalstown Forest Nature Reserve, grid ref: J088 872
Rea's Wood Nature Reserve, grid ref: J142 855
Slieveanorra Nature Reserve, grid refs: D132 265, D135 265, D147 274 and D155 286.
Straidkilly Nature Reserve, grid ref: D302 163

County Armagh
Brackagh Nature Reserve, grid ref: J019 507 
Oxford Island National Nature Reserve, grid ref: J053 616

County Down
Ballyquintin National Nature Reserve, grid ref: J621 458
Bohill Nature Reserve, grid ref: J396 459
Cloghy Rocks Nature Reserve, grid ref: J594 478
The Dorn Nature Reserve, grid ref: J593 568
Granagh Bay Nature Reserve, grid ref: J606 485
Hollymount Forest National Nature Reserve, grid ref: J464 438
Killard Nature Reserve, grid ref: J610 433
Murlough National Nature Reserve, grid ref: J414 351
North Strangford Lough National Nature Reserve, grid ref: J508 706
Quoile Pondage Nature Reserve, grid ref: J49647
Rostrevor Oakwood Nature Reserve, grid ref: J186 170
Turmennan Fen Nature Reserve, grid ref: J485 503

County Fermanagh
Castle Archdale Islands Nature Reserve
Castle Caldwell Nature Reserve, grid ref: H020 600
Correl Glen Nature Reserve, grid ref: H075 545
Hanging Rock and Rossaa Forest Nature Reserve, grid ref: H110 365
Killykeeghan and Crossmurrin Nature Reserve, grid ref: H112 348
Lough Naman Bog Nature Reserve, grid ref: H075 545
Marble Arch Nature Reserve, grid ref: H123 350
Reilly and Gole Woods Nature Reserve grid refs: H340 254 (Reilly) and H336 250 (Gole)
Ross Lough Nature Reserve, grid ref: H143 467

County Londonderry
Altikeeragh Nature Reserve, grid ref: C730 316
Ballymaclary Nature Reserve, grid ref: C700 365
Ballynahone Nature Reserve, grid ref: H860 980 
Banagher Glen Nature Reserve, grid ref: C672 045
Binevenagh Nature Reserve, grid ref: C685 309
Lough Beg National Nature Reserve, grid ref: H975 960
Magilligan Point Nature Reserve, grid ref: C660 390
Roe Estuary Nature Reserve, grid ref: C635 295

County Tyrone
Annagarriff Nature Reserve, grid ref: H905 6610
Boorin Nature Reserve, grid ref: H495 846
Brookend Nature Reserve, grid ref: H948 725
Killeter Nature Reserve, grid refs: H090 808 and H086 821
Meenadoan Nature Reserve, grid ref: H244 718
Mullenakill, grid ref: H893 610
The Murrins Nature Reserve, grid ref: H565 783
Lough Neagh Islands Nature Reserve

See also
National nature reserves in England
National nature reserve (Scotland)
National nature reserves in Wales

References

 
Northern Ireland
Northern Ireland coast and countryside
Nature Reserves
Geography of Northern Ireland
Conservation in Northern Ireland
Nature reserves